There are many terms in mathematics that begin with cyclic:
 Cyclic chain rule, for derivatives, used in thermodynamics
 Cyclic code, linear codes closed under cyclic permutations
 Cyclic convolution, a method of combining periodic functions
 Cycle decomposition (graph theory)
 Cycle decomposition (group theory)
 Cyclic extension, a field extension with cyclic Galois group
 Graph theory:
Cycle graph, a connected, 2-regular graph
Cycle graph (algebra), a diagram representing the cycles determined by taking powers of group elements
Circulant graph, a graph with cyclic symmetry
Cycle (graph theory), a nontrivial path in some graph from a node to itself
Cyclic graph, a graph containing at least one graph cycle
 Cyclic group, a group generated by a single element
 Cyclic homology, an approximation of K-theory used in non-commutative differential geometry
 Cyclic module, a module generated by a single element
 Cyclic notation, a way of writing permutations
 Cyclic number, a number such that cyclic permutations of the digits are successive multiples of the number
 Cyclic order, a ternary relation defining a way to arrange a set of objects in a circle
 Cyclic permutation, a permutation with one nontrivial orbit
 Cyclic polygon, a polygon which can be given a circumscribed circle
 Cyclic shift, also known as circular shift
 Cyclic symmetry, n-fold rotational symmetry of 3-dimensional space

See also
 Cycle (disambiguation)